Sandy Creek  is a tributary of the Allegheny River in Venango, Mercer and Crawford counties in Pennsylvania in the United States.

See also
 List of rivers of Pennsylvania
 List of tributaries of the Allegheny River

References

Rivers of Venango County, Pennsylvania
Rivers of Mercer County, Pennsylvania
Rivers of Crawford County, Pennsylvania
Rivers of Pennsylvania
Tributaries of the Allegheny River